Celso Adolfo Castillo (September 12, 1943  November 26, 2012) was a Filipino film director and screenwriter.

Early life and education

Castillo was born in Siniloan, Laguna on September 12, 1943. He became a movie director, scriptwriter and actor. He was the son of lawyer-writer Dominador Ad Castillo, and Marta Adolfo.

Celso Castillo studied at Manuel L. Quezon University and obtained his Bachelor of Arts degree in English literature in 1964.

Career

Castillo started as a writer for a comic magazine. With the help of his father, he published his own magazine where he wrote all the stories from cover to cover, using different names as authors. A movie producer commissioned him to write a script on the character of "James Bandong", named after Britain's superspy. The film made money and it was followed by a sequel, Dr. Yes, 1965, a spoof on the British film, Dr. No. He wrote and directed his first movie, Misyong Mapanganib (Dangerous Mission), in 1966.

The most memorable of his earlier films is Asedillo, 1971, based on a Filipino rebel of the 1920s who was hunted down as a bandit by the American colonial government. With this film, Fernando Poe, Jr. acquired the image that was to set him off as a legendary gunslinger, a defender of the poor and oppressed. Castillo also made Ang Alamat (The Legend), 1972, with Poe as a reluctant hero who battle a whole private army all by himself to defend his townfolks.

Succeeding Castillo films aspired towards thematic originality: small-town perversion in Ang Madugong Daigdig ni Salvacion (The Bloody World of Salvacion), 1975; incest in Tag-ulan sa Tag-araw (Rainy Days in Summer), 1975; political and period gangsterism in Daluyong at Habagat (Tall Waves, Wild Wind), 1976. Even his sex films had a to message to tell. One finds spiritual undertones in the story of an oversexed girl in Nympha (Nymph), 1971; a struggle of conscience in a stripteaser who laughed on the outside but cried on the inside in Burlesk Queen (Burlesque Queen), 1977; tribal conflict in Aliw-iw, 1979; a conflict of family values in Snake Sisters, 1983; and the politics of domination in Isla (Island), 1983.

Other notable Castillo films are Ang Mahiwagang Daigdig ni Pedro Penduko (The Wonderful World of Pedro Penduko), 1973; Ang Pinakamagandang Hayop sa Balat ng Lupa (The Most Beautiful Animal on the Face of the Earth), 1975; Ang Alamat ni Julian Makabayan (The Legend of Julian Makabayan), 1979; Totoy Boogie, 1980; Uhaw na Dagat (Thirsty Sea), 1981; Pedro Tunasan, 1983; Virgin People, 1983; and Payaso (Clown), 1986. It was Castillo who started a trend in Philippine movies known as the wet look which later helped establish bomba film as a definite genre.

Castillo also became the "Master Of Horror And Suspense" when actress Susan Roces shifts to the Classic Pinoy Gothic genre her first horror film was Patayin Mo Sa Sindak Si Barbara (Kill Barabara In Terror) about the malevolent spirit of a suicidal sister comes to torment against her very own sister out of jealousy and resentment and even possessing her own daughter for her own sinister plans, 1974; Maligno (Satan's Seed) about a family targeted by a Satanic Cult and their accomplices of witches and warlocks attempting to steal a beautiful woman's innocence and finds herself impregnated by an evil spirit fearing that the child she would conceive became the child of the devil also encountering bizzare events and hallucinogenic incidents, 1977.Shifting to the 90s and 2000s Lihim ni Madonna (Madonna's Secret) about a brainwashing ghost from the past drives a young woman to the brink of derangement and insanity, 1997; Sanib (Possessed) talks about a young bride finds herself being possessed by the specter of her long dead stepsister, 2003.

Castillo won the Filpino Academy of Movie Arts and Sciences (FAMAS) awards for best director and best story for Pagputi ng Uwak, Pag-itim ng Tagak (When the Crow Turns White, When the Heron Turns Black), 1978, and also won the Urian awards for best director and best screenplay for the same picture. He shared the story credits with Ruben Nicdao, and the screenplay credits with Lando jacob, Ishko Lopez and Ruben Nicdao. He won the FAMAS best director trophy again in 1985 for Paradise Inn, a Lolita Rodriguez-Vivian Velez starrer. He also has a FAMAS best supporting actor award, for Sampung Ahas ni Eba (Ten Snakes of Eve), in 1984.

Castillo's last directing role was Medical Center in 2011, while his last acting career on TV was Reputasyon in 2011.

Personal life

Family
Castillo was married 3 times and his last wife was Ofelia Lopez-Castillo.  He had many children: Christopher (Jan. 19, 1964-Aug. 12, 2018), Catherine, John, Amerjapil, Crystal, Amir, Kid, Patrick, Monique and Roxanne Ad Castillo.

Death
Celso Ad Castillo, died early morning of November 26, 2012, due to a heart attack, according to the director’s brother John. Castillo, who was working on his autobiography Celso Ad. Castillo: An Autobiography and His Craft, died at 1:45 a.m. at his home in Siniloan, Laguna. He was brought to Pakil General Hospital at around 3:00 AM where he was declared dead on arrival.
He was buried beside his son Christoper at Siniloan Public Cemetery in Siniloan, Laguna

Filmography

Director

Actor

Writer

Story

Screenplay

Awards

References

External links

1943 births
2012 deaths
People from Laguna (province)
Filipino film directors
Filipino writers
Filipino screenwriters
Manuel L. Quezon University alumni
Male actors from Laguna (province)
Artists from Laguna (province)
Horror film directors